State Highway 66 (SH 66) is a state highway in the U.S. state of Texas, connecting Garland to Greenville. The route runs roughly parallel to Interstate 30, passing through Rowlett, Rockwall, Fate, Royse City, and Caddo Mills. It also crosses Lake Ray Hubbard twice. It is known locally as Lakeview Parkway in Rowlett and as Avenue B in Garland.

History

SH 66 was previously designated first on August 21, 1923 as a route from Bogata northeast through Clarksville toward the Oklahoma town of Idabel, replacing part of SH 37. On June 24, 1931, this route had been added as a northern extent of SH 37, and SH 66 was instead assigned along an ambitious route spanning the entire state from Wichita Falls to Pharr, replacing part of SH 25, part of SH 24, part of SH 108 (causing the rest of SH 108 to be cancelled in exchange of mileage, but that section was restored on July 24, 1932), all of SH 145, and part of SH 12. On November 30, 1932, it extended south to the Rio Grande near Hidalgo, replacing part of SH 4, which was rerouted west. On October 17, 1933, it extended to Oklahoma following SH 79. On July 15, 1935, everything north of Wichita Falls was cancelled and the section from the Brazos River to Stephenville was cancelled.  On November 5, 1935, the section from the Brazos River to Stephenville was restored. On February 11, 1937, the section north of Wichita Falls was restored, but as part of SH 79 only. On September 26, 1939, this entire second route was cancelled in favor of U.S. Highway 281, with one section from US 281 to the Hidalgo International Bridge becoming a spur of US 281, but Spur 241 in 1961.

The current route was designated on November 30, 1961, replacing FM 7 and U.S. Highway 67, which was rerouted atop I-30.

Junctions

References

066
U.S. Route 67
Transportation in Dallas County, Texas
Transportation in Rockwall County, Texas
Transportation in Collin County, Texas
Transportation in Hunt County, Texas